Veronica Swift (born May 14, 1994) is an American jazz and bebop singer.

Early life 
Swift was raised in Charlottesville, Virginia, as part of a family of musicians. Her parents are late jazz pianist Hod O'Brien and singer Stephanie Nakasian. At the age of nine, she recorded her debut album, Veronica’s House of Jazz (2004), featuring Richie Cole playing with her father's rhythm section. She began touring with her parents at this time as well. At age eleven, she appeared in the series Women in Jazz at Dizzy's Club Coca-Cola; At the age of 13, she released her second album, It's Great to Be Alive (2007), on which saxophonist Harry Allen also played.

Swift earned her bachelor's degree in jazz voice in 2016 from the University of Miami's Frost School of Music. While there, she composed a goth-rock opera entitled Vera Icon about a homicidal nun. Swift says she "needed an outlet for the anger" she felt at her father's cancer, and needed a more dramatic genre to express the emotion. Her 2015 album, Lonely Woman, includes two songs with her father at the piano and may represent the last recording by Hod O’Brien, who died in 2016. Swift placed second at the 2015 Thelonious Monk Competition. Following graduation, she moved to New York City, where she played Saturday nights at the Birdland jazz club.

Career 
She appeared with Chris Botti, Benny Green, and Michael Feinstein. She toured with Wynton Marsalis and the Jazz at Lincoln Center Orchestra. 
She was involved in ten recording sessions between 2004 and 2019. In 2019, she went on tour with the Benny Green Trio.

Bill Milkowski said she has perfect pitch and phrasing.

Awards and honors 
 2019:  Best New Artist and Best Vocal Release (for Confessions) in Jazz Times Readers' Poll

Discography 
Solo

Veronica's House of Jazz (HodStef, 2004), with Richie Cole, Hod O'Brien, Pete Spaar, Ronnie Free, Stephanie Nakasian
It's Great to Be Alive! (HodStef, 2007), with Harry Allen, Hod O'Brien, Lee Hudson, Neal Miner, Jeff Brillinger, Stephanie Nakasian
Lonely Woman (HodStef, 2015), with Emmet Cohen, Benny Bennack III, Daryl Johns, Matt Wigler, Scott Lowrie
Confessions (Mack Avenue, 2019)
This Bitter Earth (Mack Avenue, 2021)

Appearances

Jeff Rupert with Veronica Swift Let's Sail Away (Rupe, 2017), with Dan Miller, Christian Herrera, Saul Dautch, Richard Drexler, Charlie Silva, Marty Morell
Benny Green: Then and Now (2018), with Anne Drummond, David Wong, Kenny Washington, Josh Jones

References

External links 

 
 
 
 Portrait

1994 births
Living people
American women jazz singers
American jazz singers
Musicians from Charlottesville, Virginia
Singers from Virginia
21st-century American women singers
21st-century American singers